Paul Georg Daniel Köhler (31 August 1895 – 17 December 1969) was a Danish diver. He competed in the men's 10 metre springboard event at the 1920 Summer Olympics.

References

External links
 
 

1895 births
1969 deaths
Danish male divers
Olympic divers of Denmark
Divers at the 1920 Summer Olympics
Divers from Copenhagen